Broken Angels may refer to:
 Broken Angels (novel), a 2003 science fiction novel by Richard K. Morgan
 Broken Angels (manga), a 1999 five-volume manga series by Setsuri Tsuzuki
 Broken Angels, a poetry collection, including a title poem, by Susanna Roxman